William Leonard Welch  (born 2 April 1972) is an English Industrial designer. William is the son of the late post-war Industrial Designer Robert Radford Welch (21 May 1929 – 15 March 2000). In 2004 Welch became a Fellow of Chartered Society of Designs. In 2007 Welch was invited to become Fellow of The Royal Society of Arts and as a Freeman, holds a key to the city of London.

Early life and training 
William Welch was born in Leamington Spa and raised in nearby Stratford-upon-Avon, Warwickshire. From 1995, he studied design at the University of Central England (now Birmingham City University) where he completed courses in Furniture Design and Silversmithing, before going on to complete his Master of Arts Degree at The Royal College of Art, London in 2001.

(1995–1997) Welch also worked for Pentagram Design London as a junior designer under practice partner Kenneth Grange, and later worked in the same design consultancy for Daniel Wiel (1997–1999).

Through completing a research and development project, designing for people with physical disabilities at The Helen Hamlyn Centre for Design, Welch created cutlery for people with physical disabilities called "Adaptable Cutlery", which changed shape to accommodate the user’s physical abilities. This gained the graduating year’s top Helen Hamlyn Award for Design in 2001, The Lord Snowdon Award. The Adaptable Cutlery was also a category award winner for the Peugeot/Oxo Design Awards in 2002, and was crowned overall winner of all ten design categories, securing prize money of £16,000.

(2001–2005) Following the death of his father, William was appointed Company Director at Robert Welch Designs Ltd. Employed as a Design Director, William worked alongside his brother Rupert, until breaking away from the company and launching Studio William Cutlery in 2005.

Silversmithing 
Welch worked as an apprentice at his late father’s studio and workshop, studying design and silversmithing under his father and also Silversmith and model maker John Limbery.  Welch completed his Silversmithing training focusing his Master of Arts Degree towards mass-production and industrial design at The Royal College of Art, London.

Cutlery designs 
Studio William's cutlery designs are on display in permanent museum collections worldwide including the Chicago Athenaeum Museum, Chicago, and the RedDot Museum in Essen, Germany. Studio William's designs are also displayed at the Victoria and Albert Museum, London, where selected cutlery ranges accompanied the Sweet Instruments of Desire competition exhibition, set by Studio William in partnership with John Lewis. As part of the design brief students from the Royal College of Art, Sheffield Hallam University, Birmingham City University and the Edinburgh College of Art were invited to submit work that explored and challenged the traditional orthodoxy that surrounds the dessert course of a meal, with the winning design being manufactured by Studio William, and sold in John Lewis department stores across the country.

Public work, awards and honours 
William Welch has been frequently recognised for his outstanding work and innovative designs. Studio William Cutlery has also been recognised internationally as a leading supplier of premium cutlery, and has been the recipient of numerous awards. These accolades include:
(1997) Scholarship, Worshipful Company of Goldsmiths
(1999) Winner - Silver Product Design Award, Hospitality Show
(1999) Short-listed, Oxo/Peugeot Design Awards
(2000) Short-listed, Oxo/Peugeot Design Awards
(2000) Finalist, Bombay Sapphire Competition
(2001) Runner up, Deutsche Bank, Pyramid Awards
(2001) Winner - The Lord Snowdon Award, Design for Disabilities
(2001) Winner - Borders Group/RCA Society Award for "skill and innovation in design".
(2002) Highly commended - V&A/Homes & Gardens, Classic Design Awards
(2002) Winner - Form 2002 Award, Tendence – Frankfurt International Fair
(2002) Winner - Applied Metal Design, Oxo/Peugeot Design Awards
(2002) Overall Winner - Oxo/Peugeot Design Awards
(2004) Nominated for ‘Products for the Home - Product Design’, D&AD (Design and Art Direction Awards) and published in the Awards Annual
(2004) Winner, Kitchen Products, D&AD awards (design and decoration awards) 2004
(2006) Designpreis Nominee
(2007) Winner - RedDot Design Award (for OLIVE Cutlery)
(2008) Designpreis Nominee
(2008) Winner - Good Design Award (for KARRI Cutlery)
(2008) Winner - Good Design Award
(2010) Winner - RedDot Design Award (for KARRI Cutlery)
(2010) Winner - RedDot Design Award (for MULBERRY Cutlery)
(2011) Winner - RedDot Design Award (for MULBERRY Cutlery)
(2011) Winner - Good Design Award (for MAHOGANY Cutlery)
(2011) Designpreis Nominee
(2012) Designpreis Nominee
(2012) Winner - RedDot Design Award
(2012) Winner - IF Product Design Award (for MAHOGANY Cutlery)
(2012) Studio William Welch Exhibition - Victoria & Albert Museum, London
Victoria & Albert Museum acquire 7 cutlery patterns for their permanent collection as an example of outstanding contemporary, British design.
(2013) Winner - Good Design Award (for KUMQUAT Cutlery)
(2014) Designpreis Nominee
(2015) Winner - Good Design Award (for BALSA Cutlery)
(2015) Winner - Good Design Award (for MULBERRY Cutlery)
(2015) Winner - If Homestyle Award (for MULBERRY Cutlery)
(2016) Winner - Good Design Award (for MULBERRY Cutlery)
(2016) Winner - Red Dot Award (for BALSA Cutlery)
(2016) Winner - Homestyle Award (for BALSA Cutlery)
(2017) Winner - German Design Award (for BALSA Cutlery)
(2018) Winner - German Design Award (for TILIA Cutlery)
(2018) Winner - IF Design Award (for TILIA Cutlery)

Alongside these awards, Welch’s cutlery designs are on display in permanent museum collections worldwide, including:
The Chicago Athenaeum Museum, USA
The MAK Museum, Vienna, Italy
The RedDot Museum, Essen, Germany
The Victoria & Albert Museum, London, UK
The London Design Museum, London, UK

At the V&A, selected cutlery ranges accompanied the Sweet Instruments of Desire competition exhibition, launched by Studio William in partnership with British high-street retailer, John Lewis. As part of the design brief students from the Royal College of Art, Sheffield Hallam University, Birmingham City University and the Edinburgh College of Art, were invited to submit work that explored and challenged the traditional orthodoxy that surrounds the dessert course of a meal. The winning design was manufactured by Studio William and sold in John Lewis stores across the country.

Charity work 
William supports a number of charities through both in person and through business activities.
A supporter of the ITF (International Tree Foundation) since 2008. Replanting and protecting Rainforests around the World. Proceeds from sales of Studio William Cutlery goes toward planting new trees with the ITF.
 Hilton Charity Fund
Crisis

References 

1972 births
Living people
Alumni of Birmingham City University
Alumni of the Royal College of Art
British industrial designers
English silversmiths